Alfonso Toft (Birmingham 1866–1964), was a British landscape artist. He was the son of Charles Toft (1832–1901) and was born in the Birmingham suburb of Handsworth.  He came from a family of Staffordshire pottery artists.  His father was a principal modeller for Wedgwood pottery from 1876–88 and also an artist. His brother was the sculptor Albert Toft.

He was a member of the Royal Institute of Oil Painters.

In 1910, 1912 and 1914 he was one of the artists who represented Britain at the Venice Biennale He also designed the medal for the coronation of George V.

Collections

The National Museum of Wales, Cardiff
Birmingham Museum & Art Gallery
The Potteries Museum & Art Gallery, Staffordshire
Newcastle-under-Lyme Borough Museum & Art Gallery
Hull University
Wolverhampton Art Gallery
Royal Collection

References

External links
 Exhibition catalogue for Toft's Newfoundland paintings
 Review of Toft exhibition at the Fine Art Society in the Connoisseur magazine, 1920
 

1866 births
1964 deaths
British landscape painters
19th-century British painters
British male painters
20th-century British painters
People from Handsworth, West Midlands
19th-century British male artists
20th-century British male artists